Winifred Horan is an American violinist/fiddler of Irish descent.  After classical training, she played with the all-female Celtic music ensemble Cherish the Ladies before becoming an original member
of the Irish traditional music group Solas.

Biography
Horan was born in New York City
to Irish parents
and studied piano (taught by her father, a carpenter and musician)
and Irish fiddle playing at a young age.
She attended and graduated from the New England Conservatory
in Boston, Massachusetts, where she studied classical violin,
and the Aspen Music Festival and School in Aspen, Colorado.  She played with multiple orchestras, including the Boston Pops Orchestra, and string quartets, before joining the all-female Celtic music ensemble Cherish the Ladies in 1990.  She co-founded
Solas in 1994,
and is on fiddle and backing vocals.
On her participation in Solas and, in particular, touring with the group, Horan expressed in a 2008 interview: "Traveling the world with Solas has been one of the best things about being in the band."

Outside of her work with Solas, Horan was a member of and toured with The Sharon Shannon Band, and also performed with Irish singer-songwriter Pierce Turner. She was "featured fiddler" on When Juniper Sleeps, a 1996 solo album by Séamus Egan, and co-writer of certain tracks for the 1995 film The Brothers McMullen. She is also a nine-time champion Irish stepdancer and an All-Ireland fiddle champion,
having won an All-Ireland Junior Championship at age eleven.  In a December 2001 interview, Horan identified Liz Carroll, Egan, and Sharon Shannon as her top musical influences.

Horan released her first solo album, Just One Wish, in October 2002 on Shanachie Records. In 2006, she and fellow Solas member Mick McAuley, an accordionist, released Serenade on Compass Records, with covers of "After the Gold Rush" by Neil Young and "Make You Feel My Love" by Bob Dylan.
Siobhán Long, writing for The Irish Times, listed Serenade as fifth on her list of top five Irish traditional music albums released in 2006.  Horan composed two of the album's tracks: "Little Mona Lisa" and "A Daisy in December", which was featured during the third season of the American reality television competitive dance series So You Think You Can Dance.

Horan lives in Dover, New Hampshire and is currently a member of the faculty of The New England Conservatory.

Selected Discography

with Cherish The Ladies
 1992 – The Back Door
 1993 – Out And About
 1998 – One and All: The Best of Cherish the Ladies

with Solas
 1996 — Solas
 1997 — Sunny Spells and Scattered Showers
 1998 — The Words That Remain
 2000 — The Hour Before Dawn
 2002 — The Edge of Silence
 2003 — Another Day
 2005 — Waiting for an Echo
 2006 — Reunion: A Decade of Solas – CD and DVD
 2008 — For Love and Laughter
 2010 — The Turning Tide
 2013 — Shamrock City

Solo and other selected albums
 1996 — The Irish Isle: Traditional Irish Music (James Keane with Winifred, Seamus Egan, Sue Richards)
 2002 — Just One Wish
 2002 — Pleasures Of Home (Cracker Barrel label)
 2006 — Serenade (with Mick McAuley)
 2014 — Lost Girl Found

References

External links
 Winifred Horan on Myspace
 
 

American fiddlers
American people of Irish descent
Aspen Music Festival and School alumni
Living people
Musicians from New York City
New England Conservatory alumni
Musicians from Philadelphia
Year of birth missing (living people)
21st-century American violinists
21st-century American women musicians